The 1998 Asian Junior Women's Volleyball Championship was held in Trang, Thailand from 22 – September to 29 September 1998

Pools composition
The teams are seeded based on their final ranking at the 1996 Asian Junior Women's Volleyball Championship.

* Withdrew

Preliminary round

Pool A

|}

|}

Pool B

|}

|}

Final round

Classification 5th–8th

Championship

5th–8th semifinals

|}

Semifinals

|}

9th place

|}

7th place

|}

5th place

|}

3rd place

|}

Final

|}

Final standing

References
Results (Archived 2014-10-18)

1998 in women's volleyball
V
International volleyball competitions hosted by Thailand
1998
1998 in youth sport